The 2010 County Championship season, known as the LV County Championship for sponsorship reasons, was the 111th County Championship season. It was contested through two divisions: Division One and Division Two. Each team played all the others in their division both home and away. The top two teams from Division Two were promoted to the first division for the 2011 season, while the bottom two sides from Division One were relegated.

Nottinghamshire County Cricket Club won the Championship for the sixth time in their history, the first time since 2005. Essex and Kent were relegated from Division One, having been promoted only the season previous, and the two teams relegated to Division Two at the end of 2009, Sussex and Worcestershire, were promoted back into Division One at the first time of asking.

Teams

Standings
 Pos = Position, Pld = Played, W = Wins, L = Losses, D = Draws, T = Ties, A = Abandonments, Bat = Batting points, Bowl = Bowling points, Ded = Deducted points, Pts = Points.
 Points awarded: W = 16, L = 0, D = 3, A = 3

Division One

Division Two

Results

Division One

Source:
 Last updated : 16 September 2010

Division Two

Source:
 Last updated : 16 September 2010

References

County Championship seasons
County Championship